Hugo-Jacobi-Preis is a literary prize of Germany.

Recipients
1955 Rainer Brambach
1956 Hans Magnus Enzensberger
1957 Cyrus Atabay
1958 Peter Rühmkorf
1959 John Poethen
1960 Helmut Heißenbüttel
1964 Walter Gross
1967 Michael Ende

German literary awards